Heather Young may refer to:

Heather Young (actress) (born 1945), American television actress
Heather Rae Young (born 1987), American  model
Heather Bowie Young (born 1975), American golfer
Heather Young (filmmaker), Canadian filmmaker

See also
Heather Armitage (born 1933), British sprinter formerly known as Heather Young